Francisco Manuel Vieira (29 October 1925 – 23 December 2013) was a Brazilian Catholic bishop.

Vieira was born in the portuguese town of Rio Tinto (Gondomar) and was ordained in Brazil to the priesthood in 1952. He served as titular bishop of Hippo Diarrhytus and was auxiliary bishop of the Roman Catholic Diocese of São Paulo, Brazil, from 1974 to 1989. He then served as bishop of the Roman Catholic Diocese of Osasco, Brazil from 1989 to 2002.

Notes

1925 births
2013 deaths
20th-century Roman Catholic bishops in Brazil
Roman Catholic bishops of São Paulo
Roman Catholic bishops of Osasco